Netball was first introduced at 2001 Southeast Asian Games in Kuala Lumpur, Malaysia. It was staged for the second time during 2015 Southeast Asian Games in Singapore.  It was categorized under Category 3: Other sports, in Southeast Asian Games Federation Charter and Rules.

All-time medal table
Updated after the 2019 Southeast Asian Games

Women's tournaments

References

 
International netball competitions
Netball at multi-sport events
Netball competitions in Asia
Netball